Capheris is a genus of spiders in the family Zodariidae. It was first described in 1893 by Simon. , it contains 11 species, all from sub-Saharan Africa.

Species
Capheris comprises 11 species:
 C. abrupta Jocqué, 2009 — South Africa
 C. apophysalis Lawrence, 1928 — Namibia
 C. approximata (Karsch, 1878) — Namibia, South Africa
 C. brunnea (Marx, 1893) — Congo
 C. crassimana (Simon, 1887) (type) — Angola, Botswana, Namibia, South Africa
 C. decorata Simon, 1904 — Zambia, Zimbabwe, Mozambique, South Africa
 C. fitzsimonsi Lawrence, 1936 — Zimbabwe, Botswana
 C. kunenensis Lawrence, 1927 — Namibia
 C. langi Lawrence, 1936 — Botswana, South Africa
 C. oncka Lawrence, 1927 — Angola, Namibia, Botswana
 C. subtilis Jocqué, 2009 — Namibia, Zimbabwe, South Africa

References

Zodariidae
Araneomorphae genera
Spiders of Africa